Oxalis bifida is a species of plant. The species was originally described by Carl Peter Thunberg in 1794

Description
A geophyte.

Range
Endemic to the Western Cape of South Africa.

Habitat
A shade loving plant.

Ecology
Is susceptible to an anther-smut fungus (Thecaphora capensis).

Uses
Edible.

Etymology

Taxonomy
Described by Carl Peter Thunberg in 1781.

References

bifida
Taxa named by Carl Peter Thunberg